Patrick Reilly (born 18 October 1939) is an Irish folk singer and guitarist. Born in Rathcoole, County Dublin, he is one of Ireland's most famous balladeers and is best known for his renditions of "The Fields of Athenry", "Rose of Allendale" and "The Town I Loved So Well". Reilly released his version of "The Fields of Athenry" as a single in 1983; it was the most successful version of this song, remaining in the Irish charts for 72 weeks. He achieved number 1 in Ireland with the Liam Reilly (no relation) written song "Flight of Earls" in 1988.

For years a solo performer, he joined The Dubliners in 1996 as a replacement for long-time member Ronnie Drew. He left the group after nine years to move to New York City (where he owns a number of pubs) in 2005 and was replaced by Patsy Watchorn. After living in New York for several years he moved back to Ireland.

Discography

Solo albums
 The Life of Paddy Reilly (1971)
 Paddy Reilly at Home (1972)
 The Town I Loved So Well (1975)
 Green Shamrock Shore (1980)
 The Fields of Athenry (1982)
 Live Paddy Reilly (1983)
 The Old Refrain (1984)
 Greatest Hits Live (1985)
 Paddy Reilly's Ireland (1986)
 Paddy Reilly Now (1988)
 Sings the Songs of Ewan MacColl (1990)
 Gold and Silver Days (1991) Recorded and released on Irish record label Celtic Collections
 Come Back Paddy Reilly (2003)
 32 Counties in Song (2003) Recorded and released on Irish record label Celtic Collections

With The Dubliners
 Further Along (1996)
 Alive Alive-O (1997)
 40 Years (2002)
 Live from the Gaiety (2002)

References

1939 births
Irish expatriates in the United States
Irish folk musicians
Irish folk singers
Irish guitarists
Irish male singers
Living people
Irish male guitarists
Musicians from County Dublin
The Dubliners members